Michael Mandt (born October 25, 1971) is an American television producer.

Early life
Born in Ohio, Mandt graduated from Fordham University in the Bronx, New York, and moved north to Bristol, Connecticut where he began his television career as a Production Assistant at ESPN working on SportsCenter and other studio shows.

Television and film
Michael worked as a producer for NBC Sports during the 2000 Summer Olympics and his work earned an Emmy Award. In 2001, he and his brother Neil Mandt started Mandt Bros. Productions. That same year, they produced Reel Classics Uncut for ESPN. The following year, they produced ESPN's first reality show: Beg, Borrow & Deal. In 2003, the brothers created the show Jim Rome is Burning starring popular sports radio host Jim Rome. In 2004, they created the series My Crazy Life for E! Entertainment Television and in 2007 they created Destination Truth for the Sci Fi Channel. Michael has also produced and or directed segments of the ESPY awards since 2005.

Michael Mandt appeared in the film Hijacking Hollywood. More recently, he produced the indie film Last Stop for Paul in 2006.

In January 2012, Neil and his brother sent shock waves through the sports and entertainment world when they entered into a partnership agreement with RUFF China, the organization in who holds a permit to put on MMA events as a legal sport in the country of China.  Together with his brother, Neil is working with RUFF to establish the world's biggest MMA league in the world, based in China.

In the Spring of 2012 Neil and his brother Michael saw a long term movie project finally pay off when Jon Hamm, star of Mad Men, attached himself to star in the movie The Million Dollar Arm. The feature film was based on the real-life story of two young men from India who were plucked from obscurity to be signed into the Pittsburgh Pirates baseball organization. The Mandt brothers found the story and were instrumental in putting the original deal together that led to the movie deal with Hamm and Disney. They are attached as Co-Producers on the film, along with Mark Ciardi, Gordon Grey and Joe Roth.

As ESPN executive producer, Mandt said that Caitlyn Jenner was given the 2015 Arthur Ashe Courage Award because "she has shown the courage to embrace a truth that had been hidden for years, and to embark on a journey that may not only give comfort to those facing similar circumstances, but can also help to educate people on the challenges that the transgender community faces."

Internet
In 2007, Neil and Michael launched FantasySportsGirl.com, a site which provides daily video content for fantasy sports fans. The duo were also nominated for a Webby Award for their work on Last Stop for Paul.

References

External links
 of Mandt Bros. Productions

1971 births
Living people
American television producers
Fordham University alumni